Henry Johns may refer to:

 Henry T. Johns (1828–1906), Union Army soldier and Medal of Honor recipient
 Henry Van Dyke Johns (1803–1859), Episcopal clergyman